The Veliki Krivelj mine is a large copper mine located in the east of Serbia in Bor District. Veliki Krivelj represents one of the largest copper reserve in Serbia and in the world having estimated reserves of 560.5 million tonnes of ore grading 0.33% copper.

See also
 RTB Bor

References 

Copper mines in Serbia